Colin R. Wilson (born 23 July 1933) is a former Australian rules footballer who played in the Victorian Football League (VFL) .

He was a ruck rover in the Melbourne team that defeated Collingwood in the 1957 VFL Grand Final.

References

External links

Melbourne Football Club players
Living people
Ormond Amateur Football Club players
1933 births
Australian rules footballers from Victoria (Australia)
Melbourne Football Club Premiership players
One-time VFL/AFL Premiership players